Lobocheilos schwanenfeldii is a species of freshwater ray-finned fish within the family Cyprinidae, that can grow up to a length of 33.5 centimeters. Its distribution is in Indonesia within the Sumatra, Java and Borneo islands in tropical river basins. It is a benthic fish, living in slow to fast moving clear waters over gravel and rocky substrates. Its believed to feed on diatoms, filamentous algae, pieces of larger plants, and sand grains, similar to other members of its genus.

Conservation 
Lobocheilos schwanenfeldii faces localised threats such as urban development, agricultural activities (Mainly oil palm plantation), coal mining, pollution, logging and overfishing, although these are thought to no severely impact the species. Little is known about the current population of the species, although its believed to be as large as 10,000 individuals given its broad distribution in Sumatra. L. schwanenfeldii has also not been recorded in Java for over a century and surveys are required to determine if the species is still extant within the area. It has been classified as 'Least concern' by the IUCN Red List given its broad distribution and range overlapping with protected areas. Further studies are required to understand its current population size and how current threats are impacting the species.

References 

Fish described in 1854
IUCN Red List least concern species
Fish of Indonesia
Freshwater fish of Indonesia
Cyprinidae